Novomoskovsk may refer to:
Novomoskovsk, Russia, a city in Tula Oblast
Novomoskovsk Urban Okrug, the municipal formation which this city is incorporated as
Novomoskovsk, Ukraine, a town in Dnipropetrovsk Oblast
Russian submarine K-407 Novomoskovsk, a Russian Navy submarine

See also
 Novomoskovsky (disambiguation)